Ocheltree is an unincorporated community in Johnson County, Kansas, United States, and part of the Kansas City metropolitan area.

History
Ocheltree was laid out in 1867. It was named for W. A. Ocheltree, a member of the town company.

The first post office in Ocheltree was established in December 1869.

References

Further reading

External links
 Johnson County maps: Current, Historic, KDOT

Unincorporated communities in Johnson County, Kansas
Unincorporated communities in Kansas